The Pine Bluffs High School, at the junction of 7th and Elm Sts. in Pine Bluffs, Wyoming, was built in 1929.  It was listed on the National Register of Historic Places in 1996.

It was designed by architect Eugene G. Groves and was built by contractor C.H. Young and Sons.

It is Classical Revival in style.  It has a domed gymnasium-auditorium.

References

External links

High schools in Wyoming
National Register of Historic Places in Laramie County, Wyoming
Neoclassical architecture in Wyoming
School buildings completed in 1929
1929 establishments in Wyoming